The 1971 Detroit Tigers finished in second place in the American League East with a 91–71 record, 12 games behind the Orioles. They outscored their opponents 701 to 645.  They drew 1,591,073 fans to Tiger Stadium, the second highest attendance in the American League.

Offseason 
 October 9, 1970: Denny McLain, Elliott Maddox, Norm McRae, and Don Wert were traded by the Tigers to the Washington Senators for Ed Brinkman, Aurelio Rodríguez, Joe Coleman, and Jim Hannan.
 March 30, 1971: Jerry Robertson was traded by the Detroit Tigers to the New York Mets for Dean Chance and Bill Denehy.

Regular season 
Mickey Lolich became the second pitcher in the history of the American League to win 25 games but not win the Cy Young Award.

Season standings

Record vs. opponents

Notable transactions 
 April 9, 1971: Dave Boswell was signed as a free agent by the Tigers.
 May 28, 1971: Dave Boswell was released by the Tigers.
 June 8, 1971: Gene Pentz was drafted by the Tigers in the 7th round of the 1971 Major League Baseball Draft.
 June 12, 1971: Carl Cavanaugh (minors) and Mike Fremuth (minors) were traded by the Tigers to the Philadelphia Phillies for Tony Taylor.

Roster

Player stats

Batting

Starters by position 
Note: G = Games played; AB = At bats; H = Hits; Avg. = Batting average; HR = Home runs; RBI = Runs batted in

Other batters 
Note: G = Games played; AB = At bats; H = Hits; Avg. = Batting average; HR = Home runs; RBI = Runs batted in

Note: pitchers' batting statistics not included

Pitching

Starting pitchers 
Note: G = Games; IP = Innings pitched; W = Wins; L = Losses; ERA = Earned run average; SO = Strikeouts

Other pitchers 
Note: G = Games pitched; IP = Innings pitched; W = Wins; L = Losses; ERA = Earned run average; SO = Strikeouts

Relief pitchers 
Note: G = Games pitched; W = Wins; L= Losses; SV = Saves; GF = Games finished; ERA = Earned run average; SO = Strikeouts

Awards and honors 
 Mickey Lolich, Tiger of the Year award from Detroit baseball writers

League top ten finishers 
Ed Brinkman
 AL leader in games played at shortstop (159)
 AL leader in innings played at shortstop (1395-2/3)
 AL leader in assists by a shortstop (513)
 #4 in AL in games played (159)
 #7 in AL in times hit by pitch (7)

Norm Cash
 Finished 12th in AL MVP voting
 AL leader in at bats per home run (14.1)
 #2 in AL in home runs (32)
 #3 in AL in slugging percentage (.531)
 #3 in AL in OPS (.903)
 #7 in AL in times hit by pitch (7)
 #8 in AL in RBIs (91)
 #9 in AL in runs created (93)
 7th oldest player in the AL

Joe Coleman
 #3 in AL in strikeouts (236)
 #4 in AL in strikeouts per 9 innings pitched (7.43)
 #5 in AL in win percentage (.690)
 #5 in AL in innings pitched (286)
 #5 in AL in batters faced (1174)
 #6 in AL in wins (20)
 #9 in AL in complete games (16)

Bill Freehan
 AL leader in games at catcher (144)
 AL leader in complete games at catcher (128)
 AL leader in innings played at catcher (1265)
 AL leader in putouts by a catcher (912)
 #3 in AL in times hit by pitch (9)
 #8 in AL in doubles (26)
 #9 in AL in extra base hits (51)
 #9 in AL in at bats per strikeout (10.8)

Willie Horton
 #7 in AL in slugging percentage (.496)
 #7 in AL in times hit by pitch (7)
 #10 in AL in extra base hits (48)
 #10 in AL in at bats per home run (20.5)

Al Kaline 
 #3 in AL in on-base percentage (.416)
 #6 in AL in OPS (.878)
 #7 in AL in time hit by pitch (7)
 #8 in AL in batting average (.294)
 #10 in AL in bases on balls (82)
 9th oldest player in the AL

Mickey Lolich
 Finished 2nd in AL Cy Young Award voting (behind Vida Blue)
 Finished 5th in AL MVP voting
 MLB leader in wins (25)
 MLB leader in strikeouts (308)
 MLB leader in innings pitched (376)
 MLB leader in games started (45)
 AL leader in complete games (29)
 MLB leader in hits allowed (336)
 MLB leader in batters faced (1538)
 #2 in MLB in home runs allowed (36)
 #2 in MLB in earned runs allowed (122)
 #4 in AL in sacrifice hits (16)
 #4 in AL in strikeout to walk ratio (3.35)
 #5 in AL in strikeouts per 9 innings pitched (7.37)
 #7 in AL in Adjusted ERA+ (125)
 #8 in AL in bases on balls per 9 innings pitched (2.20)
 #10 in AL in ERA (2.92)

Aurelio Rodríguez
 #3 in AL in doubles (30)
 #4 in AL in triples (7)
 #4 in AL in outs (476)
 #5 in AL in at bats (604)
 #8 in AL in extra base hits (52)
 #10 in AL in strikeouts (104)

Fred Scherman
 #2 in AL in games by pitcher (69)
 #3 in AL in saves (20)
 #3 in AL in games finished (40)

Players ranking among top 100 all time at position 

The following members of the 1972 Tigers were ranked among the Top 100 of all time at their position in The New Bill James Historical Baseball Abstract in 2001:
 Bill Freehan: 12th best catcher of all time
 Norm Cash: 20th best first baseman of all time
 Dick McAuliffe: 22nd best second baseman of all time
 Aurelio Rodríguez: 91st best third baseman of all time
 Willie Horton: 55th best left fielder of all time
 Al Kaline: 11th best right fielder of all time
 Mickey Lolich: 72nd best pitcher of all time

Farm system

Notes

References 

 Detroit Tigers 1971 Regular Season Statistics at Baseball Reference
 BaseballLibrary.com Game by Game Summary of 1971 Tigers season

Detroit Tigers seasons
Detroit Tigers season
Detroit Tiger
1971 in Detroit